John Manners (27 September 1730 – 23 September 1792) was an English politician, and the eldest natural son of Lord William Manners.

In 1754, he replaced his father as Member of Parliament for Newark, which he represented until 1774.

He married Lady Louisa Tollemache on 4 September 1765, and they had ten children, several of whom adopted the surname of Talmash or Tollemache after it became clear that their mother would inherit the earldom of Dysart:
William Manners Talmash, Lord Huntingtower (1766–1833)
Hon. John Manners Tollemache (died 1837)
Hon. Charles Manners-Tollemache (2 January 1775 – 26 July 1850), married twice and had issue.
Lady Catherine Sophia Manners, or Katherine Sophia Manners (died 28 May 1825), married on 16 August 1793 as his first wife Sir Gilbert Heathcote, 4th Baronet
Maria Caroline Manners (died. 20 December 1805), married on 9 September 1799 James Duff, 4th Earl Fife
Louisa Grace Manners (died 19 February 1816), married on 15 August 1802 Aubrey Beauclerk, 6th Duke of St Albans
Lady Laura Manners Tollemache (died 11 July 1834), married on 2 June 1808 as Miss Laura Manners, John William Henry Dalrymple, later 7th Earl of Stair (1784–1840), nullified July 1811. For the subsequent history of the unfortunate Lady Laura, see "Life of Katherine Mansfield".
George Manners, died young
Elizabeth Louisa Manners, died young
Sophia Manners, died young

His wife inherited the Tollemache estates in 1820 at the age of 75. She died in 1840.

Notes

References
Manners genealogy
"The Scottish Nation: Dysart", a history of the earldom.
Dalrymple vs Dalrymple suit (1811) entire text, with judgement given by Sir William Scott for Dalrymple's first wife. A summary is provided elsewhere.

1730 births
1792 deaths
British MPs 1754–1761
British MPs 1761–1768
British MPs 1768–1774
Members of the Parliament of Great Britain for English constituencies
J